In mathematical logic, an elementary sentence is one that is stated using only finitary first-order logic, without reference to set theory or using any axioms which have consistency strength equal to set theory.

Saying that a sentence is elementary is a weaker condition than saying it is algebraic.

Related
Elementary theory
Elementary definition

References

 Mac Lane and Moerdijk, Sheaves in Geometry and Logic: A First Introduction to Topos Theory, page 4.

Mathematical logic